Southern Express (previously known as Ruhuna Red) is a franchise cricket team based in Galle, Sri Lanka.

History
The team first took part in the 2013 Super 4's T20 as Ruhuna Red, after losing two games out of three, the team was eliminated. In 2014 the team was renamed as the Southern Express

Players
Players with international caps are listed in bold.

See also
2014 Super 4's T20
Sri Lanka Cricket

References

Galle
Sri Lanka Premier League teams